Tripping the Rift is an adult CGI science fiction comedy television series. It is based on two short animations published on the Internet by Chris Moeller and Chuck Austen. The series was produced by CineGroupe in association with the Syfy network. Following its cancellation by that cable network, CineGroupe continued producing the series for the other North American and International broadcasters. The series aired on the Canadian speciality channel Space in 2004. Canada's cartoon network Teletoon has been airing the series since August 2006. Teletoon participated in the production of the third season, and aired it in 2007.  A feature-length movie version was released on DVD in 2008.

Setting
The universe is modeled largely after the Star Trek universe, with references to 'warp drive' and 'transporter' beam technology, occasional time travel, the Federation and the Vulcans. The series also includes elements borrowed from other sources such as Star Wars, 2001: A Space Odyssey and Battlestar Galactica.

The general setting is that known space is politically divided between two superpowers:  the Confederation (led by Humans, and a parody of the Federation from Star Trek) and the Dark Clown Empire (a parody of the Galactic Empire from Star Wars).  The Dark Clown Empire is a totalitarian, tyrannical police state, led by the evil Darph Bobo.  In contrast, the Confederation is technically a democratic and free society, but in practice, is dominated by mega-corporations and bloated bureaucracies.  Ultimately, both superpowers end up exploiting and restricting their inhabitants, albeit in different ways.  For example, the value placed on life is so commercialized in the Confederation that clearly sentient robots and androids are reduced to essentially slave-status.  The Dark Clown Empire practices actual slavery, and while the Confederation does not, most of its inhabitants (including the Human ones) are openly described as living in wage slavery.  The only place that anyone can truly be free is in the border region between the two superpowers, which is directly controlled by neither.  This borderland is known as "the Rift", hence those outlaws on the fringes of society who cling to their freedom by moving back and forth around the Confederation/Dark Clown Empire border to evade detection are said to be "Tripping the Rift".  The series follows one such group of outlaws led by Chode aboard the Spaceship Jupiter 42, taking odd-jobs and usually pursuing various get-rich-quick schemes.

Characters

 Chode McBlob (Stephen Root) —  Captain of the ship. Chode is a purple extraterrestrial that is described as a street-savvy, strong scoundrel and sex hound who typically gets his crew to do what he wants through manipulation and threats. He is extremely self-centered, selfish, conceited, loathsome, and has total disregard for others. He desires wealth and a better life and is driven by nothing but sex, money and food.  He is sexually involved with Six. His twin brother, Philbrick, is the king of planet Moldavia 5.
 Six - also called Six of One (listed as such in the closing credits of both versions of the Pilot episode, Love And Darph), or Six of Nine, a play on Star Trek: Voyager character Seven of Nine and the phrase "six of one, half a dozen of the other") (Patricia Beckmann and Terry Farrell in the pilot (two versions), Gina Gershon in season 1, Carmen Electra in season 2 and Jenny McCarthy in season 3) — Six is an android that was designed as a sex slave. She acts as the ship's science officer, thanks to a programming upgrade by Chode; much to his chagrin, this upgrade has also given her a conscience and sense of decency, in spite of her openly sexual nature. She often gets the crew out of trouble by using her erotic attributes and skills in bed. The final episode of the second season revealed that she was modeled after a stripper named "Haffa Dozen" (voiced by Patty Hearst), who later switched to a life of crime.
 T'Nuk Layor (Gayle Garfinkle) — T'nuk is the ship's ill-tempered, triple-breasted, quadrupedal, amorous pilot and cook. While most of the other characters consider her as grotesquely unattractive as she is unpleasant, she is considered attractive on her (unknown) home planet. She was chosen as the pilot because she is skilled at keeping the Spaceship Bob in check. Her name is based on the word nuclear, while her name spelled backwards says Royal Kunt.
 Whip (Rick Jones) — Whip is a bipedal alien reptile, and Chode's dim-witted nephew. He serves as the ship's foreman, though he is rarely seen working, and is typically an impulsive, libidinous teenager. As a chameleon, he is able to conceal his appearance and cling to walls, as well as regenerate lost body parts.
 Gus (Chris Moeller in the pilot, Maurice LaMarche in the series) — Gus is Chode's robot servant. He is the ship's engineer and is implied by the others to be homosexual (a running joke, he frequently denies his sexuality, often while engaging in stereotypical homosexual behavior). Though smarter than those around him, he is forced to serve them, as silicon organisms like him don't have the same rights as carbon-based life. He has a cynical and sarcastic attitude, resulting from the many failures he has experienced due to his less intelligent carbon-based bosses' actions. His appearance and voice is a parody of C-3PO (in the opening credits, as he uses a vacuum cleaner shaped like R2-D2).
 Spaceship Bob (John Melendez) — Bob is the A.I. that controls the spacecraft Jupiter 42 (a reference to Lost In Space and possible The Hitchhiker's Guide to the Galaxy). He suffers from agoraphobia, and often has panic attacks at inconvenient times. Only T'nuk's insults can snap him out of his panic attacks. He also desires Six, even though she says they're just friends. Bob is a parody of 2001: A Space Odyssey's Hal 9000. In fact, in one episode, a Hal program takes over the spaceship, impeding their actions as he is a computer program that "refuses to do anything".
 Darph Bobo (Chris Moeller in the pilot, Terrence Scammell in the series) — Darph Bobo is the supreme leader of the Dark Clown Empire. He wants to take over the universe because he was teased as a child (mostly by Chode). He attended high school with Chode, and the two also spent time in prison together. He has a belittling wife, Bernice, and two daughters, the teenager Babette and an unnamed younger child. Bobo is often seen with his "clown trooper" guards - a parody of Storm Troopers, while the name is a play on clone troopers. His creepy clown appearance looks similar to Pennywise from It, both his name and outfit are a parody of the Darths from the Star Wars movies, as is his desire to construct a "Death Orb", a deadly battle station, which is a parody of the Death Star.
 Captain Adam Francis Shatner (also called Commander Adam) — Captain Adam is the captain of a Confederation ship. He has a domineering wife, Nancy, and a cloned son named Adam 12. He has been known to blackmail Chode into doing his dirty work. Adam's halting and exaggerated speech pattern is a parody of William Shatner's portrayal of James T. Kirk. Adam 12 is a reference to Adam-12, the police-themed television show. A running gag throughout the series is that he and his son each have a very small penis.

Production and development
In 1997, Chris Moeller, who was working on the animated TV series King of the Hill and who had been producing animation shorts with Dark Bunny Productions, met Chuck Austen and pitched their idea for a science fiction comedy to animation studio Film Roman. In early 1998, they launched the first pilot Love and Darph on the Internet. The Chode character first appeared in the 1994 short, Wisconsin. In 2001, Film Roman released the Oh Brother teaser for episode 2, and Chris claimed the full version was made, but its release was left up to Film Roman.

In 2002, CinéGroupe acquired the rights to the five-minute short Love and Darph and approached animator Bernie Denk to direct the series, which was produced in association with Sci Fi US. Bernie Denk's team worked in Montreal on preproduction (character design, modeling and textures) while the Malaysian studio Shanghai Cartoon worked on animation using Autodesk 3ds Max software, lighting and compositing. Keyframe animation was chosen for its quality and animating control capabilities.

Episodes

Pilots
 "Love and Darph" (1998) (two versions with differing dialogue for Six)
 "Oh Brother" (Teaser) (2001)

Season 1 (2004)
 03/04/2004 "God is Our Pilot" Chode and Gus hijack a time-traveling vacation ship to the dawn of time, and accidentally kill God, causing a reality where impossible things happen because of God's death.
 03/11/2004 "Mutilation Ball" The Federation will drop all charges against Chode if he can bring in Malik, a retired Mutilation Ball player for one last game...and things get complicated when T'nuk has sex with Malik and discovers that he's a robot while the real Malik has become a bloated mess whose being exploited by his wife.
 03/18/2004 "Miss Galaxy 5000" Chode enters Six (who despises beauty pageants because of how sexist and demeaning they are to women) in a beauty contest against the daughter of his archenemy, Darph Bobo. Meanwhile, Gus trains T'nuk to be a beauty pageant contestant.
 03/25/2004 "Sidewalk Soiler" Chode is set to be executed for spitting gum on a planet where littering is punishable by death.
 04/01/2004 "The Devil and a Guy Named Webster" Chode sells his soul to the Devil to avoid a catastrophe and his only hope is Emmanuel Lewis (TV's Webster). 
 04/08/2004 "Totally Recalled" Gus's model has been recalled while Chode gets a visit from his grandfather. 
 04/15/2004 "2001 Space Idiocies" Chode is suckered into a scheme by Darph Bobo to corrupt a planet of primitives. 
 04/22/2004 "Power to the Peephole" The crew arrive on planet Floridia 7 in the middle of the Dark Clown Confederation's presidential election. Chode is chosen to get dirt on the Dark Clown Federation's candidate, George Goodfellow, while T'nuk takes a page from Monica Lewinsky's autobiography and tries to trick Goodfellow into sexually harassing her so she can get famous. 
 05/06/2004 "Nature vs. Nurture" Chode trades places with his long lost twin brother, the king of Muldavia 5.
 05/13/2004 "Aliens, Guns & A Monkey" On the way to deliver a monkey diamond, the crew get stuck on a planet where everyone carries a gun.
 05/20/2004 "Emasculating Chode" Darph Bobo kidnaps Whip (who feels like he's being treated like a child) and severs one of Chode's tentacles, which causes Chode to have a crisis over his masculinity.
 05/27/2004 "Love Conquers All...Almost" Chode plays matchmaker to the children of his mortal enemies (Darph Bobo's daughter and Commander Adam's son) in order to get money to repay a huge debt.
 06/03/2004 "Android Love" Six comes across an old boyfriend working in a male strip club.

Season 2 (2005)
 07/27/2005 "Cool Whip" Whip becomes famous on a planet after accidentally taking control of the ship.
 07/27/2005 "You Wanna Put That Where?" Chode and company try to sell off cases of lubricant on an all-gay planet. Chode and Six are jailed for having straight sex.
 08/03/2005 "Honey, I Shrunk the Crew" After Chode steals his identity and credit card, Darph Bobo seeks revenge. 
 08/10/2005 "Ghost Ship" After running out of fuel, the crew must face their greatest fears on a ghost ship.
 08/17/2005 "Benito's Revenge" Chode's grandfather is caught up in one of Darph Bobo's schemes.
 08/24/2005 "All for None" Chode's crew quits after Chode won't give into their demands for better amenities.
 08/31/2005 "Extreme Chode"
 09/14/2005 "Roswell"
 09/21/2005 "Santa Clownza"
 09/28/2005 "Chode and Bobo's High School Reunion"
 10/05/2005 "Creaturepalooza"
 10/12/2005 "Chode's Near-Death Experience"
 10/19/2005 "Six, Lies and Videotape"

Season 3 (2007)
 09/06/2007 "Chode Eraser"
 09/13/2007 "Skankenstein"
 09/20/2007 "To eBay or Not to eBay"
 10/11/2007 "23 "
 10/18/2007 "Chuckles Bites the Dust"
 10/25/2007 "The Need for Greed"
 11/01/2007 "Hollow Chode"
 11/08/2007 "Raiders of the Lost Crock of */@?#!"
 11/15/2007 "Witness Protection"
 11/22/2007 "The Son Also Rises"
 11/29/2007 "Extreme Take-Over"
 12/06/2007 "Battle of the Bulge"
 12/13/2007 "Tragically Whip"

Broadcast

The show aired on Space in Canada and the Sci Fi Channel in the United States in March 2004. Sky One began airing the show in the United Kingdom in early 2005. Space and the Sci Fi Channel aired the second season in the fall of 2005. In Australia the show appears on the Sci Fi Channel.

In Latin America it appeared on Adult Swim. In Russia, a music television channel Muz TV aired season 1 & 2 in 2007, and season 3 in early 2008. Later it aired on channel 2x2. In Germany, DMAX (TV channel) is showing season 1 & 2 starting in March 2009.  In Bulgaria, PRO BG is airing season 1 & 2 starting in September 2009 and season 3 in October 2009. Other major territories include France, Italy, Belgium, Portugal, Sweden, Spain, and Central Europe.

Re-runs of the show aired in Canada on SPACE. In 2006, the series was picked up for rebroadcast on Razer and The Comedy Network.

Tripping the Rift: The Movie
Anchor Bay released the 75 minute unrated Tripping the Rift: The Movie on DVD on March 25, 2008. The story revolves around Chode's birthday party and the events that occur during and after it, all of which prompt his nemesis Darph Bobo to dispatch a time-traveling killer clown android to assassinate Chode.

The movie consists of footage from the season three episodes "Chode Eraser", "Skankenstein", "Raiders of the Lost Crock of *@#?!" and "Witness Protection" with new bits of additional footage stitching them together into a loosely cohesive whole.

While the movie was promoted as uncensored, only dialogue was left uncensored, with nudity still obscured by "censored" balloons.

The main DVD extra is "Captain's Log: Making of Tripping the Rift: The Movie".  A Best Buy exclusive featured a second DVD with three episodes of the series centered on Six.

See also
 List of science fiction television programs

References

External links
Tripping the Rift official website. Archived from [www.trippingtherift.tv the original on September 22, 2008.
Tripping the Rift official site (Syfy). Archived from the original on July 1, 2004. Episode guide and character profiles require block-quoting for text visibility
 
 

2004 American television series debuts
2007 American television series endings
2000s American adult animated television series
2000s American comic science fiction television series
2000s American parody television series
2004 Canadian television series debuts
2007 Canadian television series endings
2000s Canadian adult animated television series
2000s Canadian comic science fiction television series
American adult animated comedy television series
American adult animated science fiction television series
American comic science fiction television series
American adult animated adventure television series
Animated space adventure television series
American adult computer-animated television series
Canadian adult animated comic science fiction television series
Canadian adult animated adventure television series
Canadian computer-animated television series
Canadian parody television series
English-language television shows
Syfy original programming
CTV Sci-Fi Channel original programming
Television series by Film Roman
Teletoon original programming
Television series based on Internet-based works
Animated television series about extraterrestrial life
Parodies of Star Trek